Konstantin Yashin (born June 18, 1973) is an Uzbekistani sprint canoer who competed in the mid-1990s. He got eliminated in the semifinals of the K-4 1000 m event at the 1996 Summer Olympics in Atlanta. Konstantin Yashin got 1st place in K-4 1000 m event at the 1998 Asian Games.

External links
Sports-Reference.com profile

1000 Meters, K4 First Place

1973 births
Canoeists at the 1996 Summer Olympics
Canoeists at the 1998 Asian Games
Living people
Olympic canoeists of Uzbekistan
Uzbekistani male canoeists
Asian Games medalists in canoeing
Medalists at the 1998 Asian Games
Asian Games gold medalists for Uzbekistan